William Fleet Burnell (born 7 January 1984) is an English cricketer.  Burnell is a right-handed batsman who bowls right-arm medium pace.  He was born in Havering, Essex.

While studying for his degree at Durham University, Burnell made his first-class debut for Durham UCCE against Durham in 2004.  He made three further first-class appearances for the university, the last of which came against Leicestershire in 2005.  In his four first-class matches, he scored 64 runs at an average of 10.66, with a high score of 49.

References

External links
Will Burnell at ESPNcricinfo
Will Burnell at CricketArchive

1984 births
Living people
People from the London Borough of Havering
Alumni of Durham University
English cricketers
Durham MCCU cricketers